Krasnopillia is an urban-type settlement in Sumy Oblast (province), located in the historic region of the Sloboda Ukraine. It was formerly the administrative seat of Krasnopillia Raion, but is now within Sumy Raion.

Location
The town is located near the Syrovatka River which is a left tributary of the Psel River. Krasnopillia is situated in a close proximity to the Russia–Ukraine border.

History
The town appeared in 1640 as a fort of the Belgorod Defense Line which Russian forces erected in Sloboda Ukraine to secure state southern borders from raids of Crimean Tatars and Nogais. Eventually the town developed into a district center of the Sumy Regiment which also served as a regional subdivision of the Sloboda Ukraine. After disbanding the regimental administrative division in 1765, Krasnopillya became a sloboda and a seat of volost (a county subdivision).

In 1901, a railway station was built in Krasnopillya. The town suffered from the Soviet Holodomor in Ukraine. 

During World War II it was under German occupation from October 15, 1941 to 1943.

Krasnopillya became an urban-type settlement in 1956.

In January 1989 the population was 9469 people. 

In January 2013 the population was 8355 people.

Transportation
Krasnopillya railway station is located on the railway which connects Sumy and Belgorod in Russia crossing the Russian border in Pushkarne. There is infrequent local traffic between Sumy and Pushkarne. There is no passenger traffic across the border.

Notable people
 Oleksandr Lebedenko (born 1989), footballer
 Valentyna Semerenko (born 1986), biathlete
 Vita Semerenko (born 1986), biathlete

References

External links
 Krasnopillya town news portal.
 Krasnopillya at gallerua.com
 Krasnopillya at the Ukrainian Soviet Encyclopedia

Urban-type settlements in Sumy Raion
Akhtyrsky Uyezd